John Theodore Flanagan (January 15, 1906 – March 11, 1996) was a professor of literature at the University of Minnesota and the University of Illinois who specialized in early literature of the Midwest.  He was born in St. Paul, Minnesota and earned a bachelor, master, and PhD degrees from the University of Minnesota.

Biography

John T. Flanagan was born January 15, 1906.

Flanagan taught for one year at the University of North Dakota in Fargo before receiving an appointment to the University of Minnesota in 1929, where he taught until 1945.  He wrote many articles during this period, especially for the Minnesota Historical Journal.  In the winter of 1939 he was a visiting lecturer in American Literature at Pomona College.  In 1943 he was awarded a Guggenheim fellowship.

In 1945 he became professor at the University of Illinois, where he spent the remainder of his career, retiring in 1972.  During his time at the University of Illinois he also was a  Fulbright lecturer at Bordeaux, Ghent, Liège and Brussels, as well as a visiting lecturer at universities in Kyoto, Moscow and Leningrad.

When Flanagan received an award for distinguished contributions from the Society for the Study of Midwestern Literature in 1977, he reflected on his career and how early on there were few programs teaching American literature, and never studied American literature formally as a student himself.  Nevertheless, he decided this would be a focus of his teaching, and his professional growth thus paralleled the emergence of the discipline.  He also did not expect that he would become one of the foremost experts in literature of the trans-Appalachian west (now known as the Midwest, but in the hey day of its settlement by Euro-Americans known as "the West"), yet he became that and published copiously both in journals and in books on a wide range of related subjects.

In addition to the Guggenheim fellowship he also received a fellowship from the Newberry Library.  He was a member of Phi Beta Kappa, the Illinois State Historical Society and the Minnesota Historical Society.

Flanagan was the grandson of Theodore Hamm, founder of the Hamm's Brewery.

After Flanagan formally retired he remained active in his organizational roles and as a writer well into his 80s.  In 1993 he moved to Salt Lake City where he died in 1996.  He was survived by three daughters, four grandchildren and two great-grandchildren.

Footnotes

Works

 
 
 
 
 
 
 
 
 
 
 

1906 births
1996 deaths
University of Minnesota alumni
University of Minnesota faculty
University of Illinois Urbana-Champaign faculty
People from Saint Paul, Minnesota
Pomona College faculty